This is the discography of British hardcore punk band Discharge.

Albums

Studio albums

Live albums

Compilation albums

Box sets

EPs

Singles

References

Discographies of British artists
Punk rock discographies